The Ducati 250 GT, also known as the Ducati Daytona GT in the UK, is a  single cylinder bevel drive SOHC motorcycle produced by the Italian manufacturer Ducati from 1964 to 1966. At the time of its launch it was the least powerful of Ducati's range of 250 cc machines.

History
Introduced in 1964, the 250 GT was intended to be a replacement for the 200 GT although production of the two models overlapped. It was the first Ducati roadster to use the 5 speed gearbox. The chassis was mostly carried over from the 200 GT but with the larger tank of the Diana and the  Ducati-made forks of the Mach 1. As the yokes of these forks carried no mountings for handlebars, high swan-neck handlebars were fitted that clamped to around the forks. Crash bars were fitted as standard. The engine was fitted with the soft 'black' camshaft and small  valves.

The 250 GT was criticised as being underpowered, so in response Ducati fitted a higher performance 'violet' cam and a larger  inlet valve for 1965, making the engine the same specification as the Monza. The  Marzocchi forks used on the Monza were also fitted but the clip on handlebars were retained, although later that year more conventional handlebars were fitted.

In 1966 the bike was restyled and shared the angular styling of the Monza, Monza Junior and Sebring.

Technical details

Engine and transmission
The single cylinder bevel drive OHC engine was of a vertically spilt unit construction and had alloy head and alloy barrels with austenitic liners. Ball bearings were used in the main bearings and roller bearings for the big end. Hairspring valve springs were used to close the valves. Compression ratio was 8:1 and claimed power output was  @ 7,200 rpm.

Fuel was delivered by a 24 mm Dell'Orto UBF carburettor. Wet sump lubrication was used and ignition was by battery and coil.

Primary drive was by helical gears to a multi-plate wet clutch to a 4 speed gearbox. Chain drive took power to the rear wheel.

Cycle parts
The single cradle frame used the engine as a stressed member. Rear suspension was by swinging arm with twin adjustable shock absorbers. At the front  telescopic forks were fitted. Brakes were drums, the front being  diameter and the rear .

References

Bibliography
 
 
 
 
 

250 GT
Standard motorcycles
Motorcycles introduced in 1964
Single-cylinder motorcycles